Polito Ibáñez (born March 29, 1965) is a Cuban singer and composer who is among the generation of contemporary artists in Cuba known as troubadors. He graduated from the Instituto Superior de Arte ingresó and joined the Nueva Trova musical movement in 1985. He won a Premio Cubadisco in 2001 with "Para no Pensar", produced by Spanish producer Jaime Stinus, in the rock music and musical production categories. He has toured in Trinidad & Tobago, Argentina, Venezuela, Spain, France, and the Netherlands with Pablo Milanés, Silvio Rodríguez and Joaquín Sabina.

References

External links
Polito Ibañez: "A mi nunca me censuraron en Cuba" 29/11/2014 Huffington Post Voces

1965 births
Living people
20th-century Cuban male singers
Cuban composers
Male composers
21st-century Cuban male singers
Cuban male musicians